Gary Palmer may refer to:

 Gary Palmer (cricketer) (born 1965), English cricketer
 Gary Palmer (politician) (born 1954), U.S. Representative from Alabama
 Gary Palmer (choreographer) (born 1951), American choreographer
 Gary Palmer (F3 Metalworx)  F3 Metalworx Pressbrake Operator. Scheduled for Fridays running RUR Panels **Coating on Line 21 per established Dib Laws**